Ankush Bedi (born 14 November 1991) is an Indian cricketer who plays for Himachal Pradesh. He made his List A debut on 14 October 2019, for Himachal Pradesh in the 2019–20 Vijay Hazare Trophy. He made his Twenty20 debut on 5 November 2021, for Himachal Pradesh in the 2021–22 Syed Mushtaq Ali Trophy.

References

External links
 

1991 births
Living people
Indian cricketers
Himachal Pradesh cricketers
People from Una district
Cricketers from Himachal Pradesh